was a  after Hōgen and before Eiryaku. This period lasted from April 1159 until January 1160.

Change of era
 January 21, 1159 : The new era name was created to mark an event or series of events. The previous era ended and a new one commenced in Hōgen 4, on the 20th day of the 4th month of 1159.

Events of the Heiji era
 January 23, 1159 (Heiji 1, the 3rd day of the 1st month ): The emperor visited his father.
 January 19–May 5, 1159  (Heiji 1, 9th-26th day of the 12th month): The "Heiji Rebellion", also known as the "Heiji Insurrection" or the "Heiji War."

Notes

References
 Brown, Delmer M. and Ichirō Ishida, eds. (1979).  Gukanshō: The Future and the Past. Berkeley: University of California Press. ;  OCLC 251325323
 Nussbaum, Louis-Frédéric and Käthe Roth. (2005).  Japan encyclopedia. Cambridge: Harvard University Press. ;  OCLC 58053128
 Titsingh, Isaac. (1834). Nihon Odai Ichiran; ou,  Annales des empereurs du Japon.  Paris: Royal Asiatic Society, Oriental Translation Fund of Great Britain and Ireland. OCLC 5850691
 Varley, H. Paul. (1980). A Chronicle of Gods and Sovereigns: Jinnō Shōtōki of Kitabatake Chikafusa. New York: Columbia University Press. ;  OCLC 6042764

External links 
 National Diet Library, "The Japanese Calendar" -- historical overview plus illustrative images from library's collection

Japanese eras